The Bayer designation Nu Columbae (ν Col / ν Columbae) is shared by two stars, in the constellation Columba:

ν¹ Columbae
ν² Columbae

Columbae, Nu
Columba (constellation)